Castle Peak is a prominent ice-covered peak,  high, standing immediately south of Murphy Glacier and close off the west side of Avery Plateau in Graham Land. It was first surveyed in 1946 by the Falkland Islands Dependencies Survey, and so named by them because of its resemblance to a ruined medieval castle.

References
 

Mountains of Graham Land
Loubet Coast